Molbog is an Austronesian language spoken in the Philippines and Sabah, Malaysia. The majority of speakers are concentrated at the southernmost tip of the Philippine province of Palawan, specifically the municipalities of Bataraza and Balabac. Both municipalities are considered as bastions for environmental conservation in the province. The majority of Molbog speakers are Muslims.

The classification of Molbog is controversial. Thiessen (1981) groups Molbog with the Palawanic languages, based on shared phonological and lexical innovations. This classification is supported by Smith (2017). An alternative view is taken by Lobel (2013), who puts Molbog together with Bonggi in a Molbog-Bonggi subgroup.

Phonology

Consonants 

 The sounds  occur as a result of loanwords from Spanish, Malay or dialects of the Sama language.
  only occurs marginally. While it was generally lost in inherited words, it is retained in some words e.g.  'tears', probably through re-borrowing.

Vowels

References

Palawanic languages
Languages of Palawan
Languages of Malaysia
Languages of the Philippines